Events in the year 2006 in Spain.

Incumbents
 Monarch: Juan Carlos I
 Prime Minister: José Luis Rodríguez Zapatero

Events
March 27: Spain's sixth terrestrial television broadcaster, La Sexta, starts programming.
November 28: Ciberobn, a public research consortium is founded.
December 30: A bombing at the Barajas Airport in Madrid kills two people and injures twenty. ETA claims responsibility.

Births
 April 20 - Dean Berta Viñales, Spanish motorcycle rider (d. 2021)

Deaths
March 25: Rocío Durcal, singer and actress
June 1: Rocío Jurado, singer and actress
November 26: Isaac Gálvez López, cyclist

See also
 2006 in Spanish television
 List of Spanish films of 2006

References

 
Spain
Years of the 21st century in Spain